Piletocera argopis is a moth in the family Crambidae. It was described by Edward Meyrick in 1886. It is found on Fiji.

References

argopis
Endemic fauna of Fiji
Moths of Fiji
Moths described in 1886